James Smith may refer to:

People

Sports figures

 James Smith (Australian rules footballer) (1899–1974), Australian rules footballer for Richmond Football Club
 James Smith (boxer) (born 1953), American boxer, nicknamed "Bonecrusher"
 James Smith (footballer, born 1844) (1844–1876), Scottish footballer, played in the first official international football match
 James Smith (footballer, born 1873) (1873–?), footballer
 James Smith (footballer, born 1908) (1908–1956), English left back who played for Doncaster Rovers, Lincoln City and Bradford City
 James Smith (footballer, born 1930) (1930–2022), English footballer for Chelsea and Leyton Orient
 James Smith (footballer, born 1985), English football player (Southport)
 James Smith (Scottish footballer) (fl. 1922), Scottish football player (Port Vale)
 James Smith (sports media figure) (born 1959), American boxer and host of In This Corner
 James Crosbie Smith (1894–1980), English cricketer
 James R. Smith (born 1959), American water polo player and coach
 James Stephen Smith (born 1963), Scottish-born Canadian ice hockey player
 James W. Smith, horse trainer
 James Smith (Leicestershire cricketer) (born 1977), English cricketer
 James Smith (New South Wales cricketer) (1880–1958), Australian cricketer
 James Smith (South Australia cricketer) (born 1988), Australian cricketer
 James Smith (Kent cricketer) (fl. 1792–1796), English cricketer
 James Smith (New Zealand cricketer) (1891–1971), New Zealand cricketer
 James Smith (sport shooter) (1931–2021), American Olympic shooter
 Jimmy Snuka (James Wiley Smith, 1943–2017), Fijian wrestler
 James Smith (Gaelic footballer), Irish Gaelic footballer

Military personnel

 James Smith (Medal of Honor, 1864) (1826–1881), Medal of Honor recipient in the American Civil War
 James Smith (Medal of Honor, 1872) (1838–?), Medal of Honor recipient for peacetime actions
 James A. Smith (Medal of Honor) (1880–1944), Medal of Honor recipient in the Boxer Rebellion
 James Smith (VC) (1871–1946), English recipient of the Victoria Cross
 James Argyle Smith (1831–1901), Confederate general in the American Civil War
 James Alexander Smith (1881–1968), English recipient of the Victoria Cross
 James C. Smith (general) (1923–2016), U.S. Army general
 James Dunlop Smith (1858–1921), British official in the Indian Army
 James E. Smith (general), U.S. Space Force general
 James Floyd Smith (1884–1956), American test pilot and instructor for Glenn Martin
 James Robert Smith (RAF officer) (1891–?), World War I flying ace
 James Thomas Smith (1908–1990), U.S. Navy admiral
 James Smith (Texas General) (1792–1855), general in the Revolutionary Army of Texas
 James Smith (frontiersman) (1737–1813), American leader of the Black Boys Rebellion against British rule in colonial America
 James Webber Smith (1778–1853), British Royal Artillery officer
 James Webster Smith (1850–1876), first black cadet at West Point

Entertainers

 James Smith, British singer and member of Hadouken!
 James Marcus Smith, singer, better known as P. J. Proby
 James Prince (James Andre Smith, born 1964), American founder of Texas-based Rap-A-Lot Records
 LL Cool J (James Todd Smith, born 1968), American rapper
 James Smith (actor) (born 1948), English actor
 James Smith, American guitarist for the band Underoath
 James Smith (born 1999), finalist in Britain's Got Talent
 James Thomas Smith, British musician and member of The xx, better known as Jamie xx

Scientists and academics

 James Smith (anaesthetist) (1917–1986), Scottish anaesthetist
 James Smith (Scottish botanist) (1763–1848), Scottish botanist
 James Smith (university principal), Scottish principal of the University of Edinburgh, 1732–1736
 James Ernest Smith (1881–1973), founder and first president of the National Radio Institute in Washington, D.C.
 James Smith of Jordanhill (1782–1867), Scottish merchant, antiquarian, architect, geologist and biblical critic
 James Cuthbert Smith (born 1954), Director of Research at the Francis Crick Institute in London
 James Edward Smith (botanist) (1759–1828), English botanist and founder of the Linnean Society of London
 James Eric Smith (1909–1990), British zoologist
 James George Smith (1819–1849), American founder of Beta Theta Pi, a prominent college fraternity
 James Greig Smith (1854–1897), Scottish surgeon and medical author
 James K. A. Smith (born 1970), Canadian-born philosopher
 J. L. B. Smith (James Leonard Brierley Smith, 1897–1968), South African ichthyologist
 James Lorrain Smith (1862–1931), Scottish pathologist
 James Morton Smith (1919–2012), American historian
 James Perrin Smith (1864–1931), American geologist and paleontologist
 James M. Smith, president of Eastern Michigan University

Politicians, judges, and civil servants

United States

 James Smith (Pennsylvania politician) (1720–1806), Pennsylvania delegate who signed the United States Declaration of Independence
 James Strudwick Smith (1790–1859), U.S. Representative from North Carolina
 James Smith, 19th-century Canadian Cree Chief, founder of the James Smith First Nation in Saskatchewan
 James W. Smith Jr., American, Chief of the Supreme Court of Mississippi
 James Y. Smith (1809–1876), American, former Governor of Rhode Island
 James Monroe Smith (Georgia planter) (1839–1915), planter and state legislator in Georgia, U.S.
 James M. Smith (died 1898), New York City politician and judge
 James Smith Jr. (1851–1927), U.S. Senator from New Jersey
 James A. Smith (mayor), first mayor of the city of Ridgefield, Washington
 James Smith (Kansas politician), Kansas Secretary of State
 James H. Smith Jr. (1909–1982), U.S. Assistant Secretary of the Navy (AIR), 1953–1956, sailor and Olympic champion
 James Horace Smith (1852–1931), mayor of Orlando
 James Peyton Smith (1925–2006), Louisiana politician
 James Vernon Smith (1926–1973), U.S. Representative from Oklahoma
 James C. Smith (politician) (born 1941), former Florida Attorney General
 James T. Smith Jr. (born 1942), American, County Executive of Baltimore County, Maryland
 James E. Smith (politician, born 1930) (1930–2020), Comptroller of the Currency of the United States, 1973–1976
 James E. Smith (Montana politician) (born 1948)
 James E. Smith Jr. (born 1967), member of the South Carolina House of Representatives
 James Smith (New Mexico politician), member of the New Mexico House of Representatives
 James F. Smith (Michigan politician) (1923–2007), member of the Michigan House of Representatives

Canada

 James Smith (1806–1868), lawyer, judge and political figure in Quebec
 James Smith (Canada West politician) (1811–1874), lawyer, judge and politician in Canada West
 James Sinclair Smith (1816–1897), Scottish-born Canadian politician
 James Edward Smith (politician) (1831–1892), mayor of Toronto
 James A. Smith (politician) (1911–1993), Canadian Member of Parliament
 James Smith (Yukon politician) (1919–2017), former commissioner of the Yukon Territory, 1966–1976

Australia

 James Smith (New South Wales politician) (1887–1962), former member of the New South Wales Legislative Assembly
 James Thorneloe Smith (1825–1902), engineer and politician in Queensland, Australia
 James Francis Smith (politician) (1844–1908), New South Wales politician
 James Joynton Smith (1858–1943), Australian politician
 James MacCallum Smith (1868–1939), Australian politician, newspaper proprietor and stock breeder
 James Norton Smith (1846–1911), Tasmanian politician
 James Vinton Smith (1897–1952), Australian politician

United Kingdom
 James Smith (1587–1667), alderman of the City of London
 James Masterton-Smith (1878–1938), British civil servant
 James Parker Smith (1854–1929), British Member of Parliament for Glasgow Partick, 1890–1906

Other countries

 James Francis Smith (1859–1928), U.S. administrator, governor of the Philippines, 1906–1909
 James Skivring Smith (1825–?), U.S.-born Vice President, 1870–1872, and interim President, 1871–1872, of Liberia
 James Skivring Smith Jr. (1891–?), Liberian politician
 James Alfred Smith, Chief Justice of the Bahamas

Religious scholars and leaders

 James Smith (archdeacon of Barnstaple) (died 1667), Archdeacon of Barnstaple
 James Smith (Vicar Apostolic of the Northern District) (1645–1711), English Roman Catholic vicar-apostolic
 James Elishama Smith (1801–1857), British journalist and religious writer
 James Allwood Smith (1806–1882), American minister and state legislator
 James Smith (archbishop of St Andrews and Edinburgh) (1841–1928), Roman Catholic archbishop in Scotland
 James E. Smith (biblical scholar) (born 1939), American biblical scholar
 James K. A. Smith (born 1970), Canadian-American proponent of Radical Orthodoxy
 James Tuttle Smith (1870–1910), rector of the Church of the Resurrection in Manhattan

Other

 James Smith, a character in the film 8 Mile
James Smith (writer) (1775–1839), British humorist
James Smith (gardener) (died 1789), gardener who journeyed to New Holland (Australia) in 1789
James Smith (architect) (c. 1645–1731), Scottish architect
James Smith (Glasgow architect) (1808–1863) Scottish architect and father of Madeleine Smith
James Smith (inventor) (1789–1850), British
James Smith (journalist) (1820–1910), Australian journalist
James Smith (miner) (1827–1897), Australian miner
James Smith (draper) (1765–1823), Close friend of Robert Burns
James Smith (murderer) (1936–1962), English murderer
James Smith (sculptor) (1775–1815), English sculptor
James Allan Smith (1841–1918), fifth Dean of St David's
James B. Smith (born 1952), Dean of Engineering, Technology, and Aeronautics at Southern New Hampshire University; former US Ambassador to Saudi Arabia
James Cooray Smith (born 1978), British writer, critic and columnist
James E. Smith (engineer), computer engineer and professor at the University of Wisconsin–Madison
James Edward Smith (murderer) (1952–1990), American murderer executed in Texas
James J. Smith, American law enforcement officer
James Kellum Smith (1893–1961), American architect
James Lawrence Smith (died 1950), co-owner of the Brooklyn Dodgers baseball team
James Lindsay Smith (ca. 1816 – ca. 1883), American slave narrative author and minister
James Martin Smith (1892–1970), American civic, business, and religious leader in Arizona
James McCune Smith (1813–1865), American physician & activist
James Milton Smith (1823–1890), American soldier & politician
 James Robert Smith (author) (born 1957), American author
 James Thorne Smith (1892–1934), American author
 James W. Smith (unionist) (1838–1903), American labor unionist

James John Smith, Irish applied mathematician and electrical engineer
James Charles Smith, engineer
 James Cowan Smith (1843–1919), British civil engineer and philanthropist

Places

 James Smith Cree Nation, Saskatchewan, Canada

See also

 Epitaph for James Smith, a 1785 satirical Scots epitaph written by poet Robert Burns
 Jim Smith (disambiguation)
 Jimmy Smith (disambiguation)
 Jamie Smith (disambiguation)
 James Smyth (disambiguation)